Luo Xiang (Simplified Chinese: 罗翔; born 1977) is a Chinese jurist. He serves as the professor and director of the Institute of Criminal Law of the China University of Political Science and Law. He is also a lawyer with his field of study centered on criminal justice and sex crimes. He is best known for his tutorials with humorous analogies and thorough interpretations on the National Judicial Examination of Chinese Mainland going viral on social medias including Bilibili, where he receives pervasive critical acclaim among the younger generation.

In December 2020, Luo Xiang was nominated as "the annual character in rule of law" by China Central Television, for his endeavors in conveying spirits of the law to the general public in Chinese mainland.

Luo Xiang has rich experience in tutorials on National Judicial Examination. He participated several times in setting examination questions for the Central College for Judicial Officers of the Ministry of Justice of the People's Republic of China.

Personal life
Luo is married to his wife from Kunming, Yunnan, China.

References

Chinese Internet celebrities
Academic staff of China University of Political Science and Law
Peking University alumni
China University of Political Science and Law alumni
China Youth University of Political Studies alumni
Chinese jurists
20th-century Chinese lawyers
21st-century Chinese lawyers
Scholars of criminal law
Chinese legal writers
People from Leiyang
1977 births
Living people